Juan Pablo Torres (born July 26, 1999) is an American professional soccer player who plays as a midfielder.

Club career
Torres played for academy club, Georgia United in his native state. On July 26, 2017, he signed his first professional contract with Belgian first tier team, Lokeren. On August 26, 2017, Torres made his professional debut, when he replaced Koen Persoons in the 90th minute of the match against K.A.S. Eupen.

On January 26, 2019, Torres returned to the United States, signing for Major League Soccer side New York City FC.

On March 8, 2021, Torres was loaned out to USL Championship club Austin Bold for the 2021 season.

Following the 2021 season, New York City opted to decline their contract option on Torres.

On February 14, 2022, Torres signed with USL Championship side Rio Grande Valley FC.

International career
Torres was born in the United States to Colombian parents. Torres was called for several US Youth Teams. He was capped seven times with the U15 team and four times with the U16 and U18 teams.

On October 23, 2018, Torres was included by coach Tab Ramos in the 20-player roster chosen to represent the United States U20 team at the 2018 CONCACAF U-20 Championship where the team finished first and qualified for the 2019 FIFA U-20 World Cup. Torres performed well in the tournament and scored four goals.

Career statistics

Club

Honors

United States U20
 CONCACAF U-20 Championship: 2018

References

External links
 Sporting Lokeren profile
 Soccerway profile
 Top Drawer Soccer profile
 Soccer Base profile

1999 births
Living people
American sportspeople of Colombian descent
People from Lilburn, Georgia
Sportspeople from the Atlanta metropolitan area
Soccer players from Georgia (U.S. state)
American soccer players
Association football midfielders
K.S.C. Lokeren Oost-Vlaanderen players
New York City FC players
Austin Bold FC players
Rio Grande Valley FC Toros players
Belgian Pro League players
Major League Soccer players
United States men's youth international soccer players
United States men's under-20 international soccer players
American expatriate soccer players
American expatriate sportspeople in Belgium
Expatriate footballers in Belgium